Brockhurst may refer to:

Places
Brockhurst, Staffordshire, a village in Staffordshire, England
Brockhurst Castle, a castle in Little Stretton, Shropshire, England
Brockhurst School, an independent boarding school for boys in Marlston, Berkshire, England
Fort Brockhurst, a scheduled ancient monument in Gosport, Hampshire, England
Lee Brockhurst, a village in Shropshire, England

People
Andrew Brockhurst (born 1964), Australian rules football player
Gerald Brockhurst (1890–1978), English painter and etcher

Fictional
Lord and Lady Brockhurst, characters in The Boy Friend (musical) by Sandy Wilson (1954)

See also
Brockenhurst, a village in Hampshire, England